Heliozela subpurpurea is a moth of the Heliozelidae family. It was described by Edward Meyrick in 1934. It is found in Japan.

References

Moths described in 1934
Heliozelidae
Moths of Japan